Liat Wexelman is the non-resident Israeli Ambassador to Kyrgyzstan (since 2018), concurrently serving in Kazakhstan where she is based.  She succeeded Mike Brodsky.

Wexelman earned a bachelor's degree (Economics and Political Science) and a master's degree (Diplomatic studies) at Tel Aviv University.

Activity
 Liat Wexelman attend Evening at the residence of the Ambassador of Israel in 10-07-2012
 the Israeli embassy in Kazakhstan held an act of handing out Tablets for children from poor and large families
 Israel's new ambassador to Kazakhstan Liat Wexelman speech in Nazarbayev University, Y News net, 15.12.2018

References

Israeli women ambassadors
Tel Aviv University alumni
Living people
Ambassadors of Israel to Kazakhstan
Place of birth missing (living people)
Date of birth missing (living people)
Ambassadors of Israel to Kyrgyzstan
Year of birth missing (living people)